The 2007–08 Czech Cup was the fifteenth season of the annual football knock-out tournament of the Czech Republic. It began on 22 August 2007 with the preliminary round and concluded with the final on 13 May 2008. The competition offered a place in the second qualifying round of the 2008–09 UEFA Cup for the winner; however since winners Sparta Prague qualified for the Champions League through the Czech First League this season, the place went to Slovan Liberec as runners-up.

Teams

Preliminary round

The preliminary round was held on 22 August 2007. The 34 participants were teams from fourth level leagues (Divize A, Divize B, Divize C, Divize D, Divize E) and from 5th level leagues (regional championships). Bold teams won and advanced to the first round.

{{OneLegResult|Rak Provodov*|| 0–2|Spartak Hulín}}

|}
* teams from regional championships

First round

The first round was held on 29 July 2007. The 96 participating teams were the 17 winners from the preliminary round and 79 teams from the second, third and fourth level leagues (Czech 2. Liga; ČFL, MSFL; Divize A, Divize B, Divize C, Divize D, Divize E).

|}

Second round

The second round was held on 5 September 2007. The 64 participating teams were the 48 winners from the first round and 16 teams from the Czech First League. Teams in Bold won and advanced to the third round.

|}

Third round

The third round was held on 26 September 2007. The 32 participating teams were all winners from the second round. Teams in Bold won and advanced to the fourth round.

|}

Fourth round

The fourth round was held on 10 October 2007. The 16 participating teams were the winners from the third round. Bold teams won and qualified for the quarter finals.

|}

Quarter finals

The quarter finals were played over two legs on 9 April and 16 April 2008. The 8 participating teams were the winners from the fourth round matches. Bold teams won and progressed to the semi finals.

|}

Semi finals

The semi finals were played on 30 April and 7 May 2008. The 4 participating teams were the winners from the quarter finals. Bold''' teams won and qualified for the final.

|}

Final

FC Slovan Liberec qualified for the 2008–09 UEFA Cup Second Qualifying Round because Sparta Prague had already qualified for European competition through the league.

Way to the victory
As all Czech First League teams, Sparta Prague joined in the second round. They won all six matches. This was their third consecutive victory in the competition.

See also
 2007–08 Czech First League
 2007–08 Czech 2. Liga

References
 Czech Republic Cup 2007/08 at RSSSF.com
 Official site (in Czech)

2007-08
2007–08 domestic association football cups
Cup